Iran Aseman Airlines Flight 746 was a Fokker F-28 flight of Iran Aseman Airlines operating on the Isfahan–Tehran route in Iran. The flight crashed near the town of Natanz on October 12, 1994, killing all the passengers and crew members.

Crash
On 12 October 1994, the flight took off from the Isfahan International Airport destination to Mehrabad International Airport with 59 passengers and seven crew on board. About 35 minutes after take off, both engines lost power and shut down due to contaminated fuel. The aircraft went into an uncontrolled descent; and 47 seconds later Flight 746 crashed into the side of a mountain and exploded. The wreckage was found over an area of  near the town of Natanz. All 59 passengers and 7 crew died in the crash.

References

External links



Aviation accidents and incidents in 1994
Accidents and incidents involving the Fokker F28
Aviation accidents and incidents in Iran
Airliner accidents and incidents caused by engine failure
History of Isfahan Province
1994 in Iran
October 1994 events in Asia